Colin Mackenzie (born 30 June 1963) is a retired British javelin thrower.

He finished seventh at the 1986 Commonwealth Games. He also competed at the 1991 World Championships, the 1993 World Championships and the 1994 European Championships without reaching the final. Throwing for Wales in 1986, he later switched his Commonwealth Games allegiance to England.

His personal best throw was 82.38 metres, achieved in August 1993 in Edinburgh.

At a meet in Palio della Quercia, Italy on 24 July 1994, Mackenzie failed a doping test, having taken dextropropoxyphene. The medication was for an ankle injury that would also bar him from competing at the 1994 Commonwealth Games in August. In September, the failed test was revealed. Mackenzie claimed his innocence, and that the medication was not performance-enhancing, but rather had the adverse effect. Nonetheless, Mackenzie received a doping ban for three months, the same as countryfellow Solomon Wariso.

References

1963 births
Living people
Welsh male javelin throwers
English male javelin throwers
Commonwealth Games competitors for Wales
Athletes (track and field) at the 1986 Commonwealth Games
World Athletics Championships athletes for Great Britain
Doping cases in athletics
English sportspeople in doping cases